Parodon is a genus of scrapetooths from South America, which can be found as far south as Río de la Plata.

Species
There are currently 14 recognized species in this genus:
 Parodon alfonsoi Londoño-Burbano, Román-Valencia & Taphorn, 2011
 Parodon apolinari G. S. Myers, 1930
 Parodon atratoensis Londoño-Burbano, Román-Valencia & Taphorn, 2011
 Parodon bifasciatus C. H. Eigenmann, 1912
 Parodon buckleyi Boulenger, 1887
 Parodon caliensis Boulenger, 1895
 Parodon carrikeri Fowler, 1940
 Parodon guyanensis Géry, 1959
 Parodon hilarii J. T. Reinhardt, 1867
 Parodon magdalenensis Londoño-Burbano, Román-Valencia & Taphorn, 2011
 Parodon moreirai Ingenito & Buckup, 2005
 Parodon nasus Kner, 1859
 Parodon pongoensis (W. R. Allen, 1942) (Pongo characin)
 Parodon suborbitalis Valenciennes, 1850

References

Fish of South America
Taxa named by Achille Valenciennes